Goan cuisine consists of regional foods popular in Goa, an Indian state located along India's west coast on the shore of the Arabian Sea. Rice, seafood, coconut, vegetables, meat, bread, pork and local spices are some of the main ingredients in Goan cuisine. Use of kokum and vinegar is another distinct feature. Goan food is considered incomplete without fish.

The cuisine of Goa originated from its Konkani roots, and was influenced by the 451 years of Portuguese rule and the Sultanate rule that preceded the Portuguese. Many Catholic dishes are either similar to or variants of their Portuguese counterparts in both naming or their use of ingredients.

Seafood

The cuisine of Goan people is mostly seafood-based; the staple foods are rice and fish. Kingfish (vison or visvan) is one of the most commonly eaten varieties of fish. Other fish varieties include pomfret, shark, tuna, sardines, and mackerel. Among the shellfish are crabs, prawns, tiger prawns, lobster, squid, and mussels. The food of Goan Christians is heavily influenced by the Portuguese. The use of vinegar, for example, is very prominent, specifically toddy vinegar, which is made from coconut sap that is retrieved from stems, and is then left to  ferment  for  four  to  six  months.

Introduction of new foods
The Portuguese introduced potatoes, tomatoes, pineapples, guavas, and cashews from Brazil to Goa and consequently India. The chili pepper is the most important aspect of Goan cuisine; it was introduced by the Portuguese and became immensely popular as a very important spice for wider Indian cuisine. One of Goa's national dishes is called sorpotel, which is made from pork.

Goan Hindu cuisine

Goan Hindu cuisine in Goa is mainly pescetarian and lacto-vegetarian and is very similar to Saraswat cuisine, from which it originates. Goan Hindu cuisine is mild, with use of tamarind and kokum for souring, and jaggery for sweetening. It uses spices such as asafoetida, fenugreek, curry leaves, mustard, and urad dal. Onion and garlic are also used. It also includes vegetables, such as lentils, pumpkins, gourds, bamboo shoots, and roots. The medium of cooking is coconut oil.

Popular Goan Hindu dishes include:
 Humann (हूमण) – Fish curry, also known as kadi or ambot with rice (शीत or भात), 
 Fried fish (तळील्ले नूस्ते)
 Fish suke or dhabdhabit (सुकें) – Dry spicy preparation of fish, served as a side dish
 Fish udid methi or uddamethi (उद्दमेथी) – Type of curry consisting of fenugreek and mackerel; a vegetarian version of this dish is also prepared using hog plums (or anything sour and tangy, such as pieces of raw mango)
 Kismur (किस्मुर) – A type of side dish normally consisting of dried fish (mostly mackerel or shrimp), onions, and coconut 
 Dangar – Goan fish cutlets (डांगर)
 Kalputi – A dish normally prepared from the head of a large fish, with onions and coconut 
 Bhaaji or shak – A generic term for stews, curries,  and stir-fried dishes made from different vegetables and fruits (भाजी or शाक)
Bhaji - Fried fritters with besan batter. Different kind of bhajis can be made by changing the vegetable used with besan. Popular bhajis include those containing onion or chilies.
 Khatkhate (ख़तखतें)
 Varan - A lentil preparation often made with coconut milk tempered with mustard, curry leaves, and chilies, served as an accompaniment to rice for the Naivedya, prepared during all Hindu festivals, and an integral part of wedding feasts.
 Tondak – A dish with beans and cashews  as the primary ingredients (तोंडाक)
(गोड्शें)
 Different varieties of pickles and papads (लोणचे or पापड)
 Solachi kadi – A spicy coconut and kokum curry (कडी)

Goan Catholic cuisine

Goan Catholic cuisine in Goa is a fusion of Goan Hindu and Portuguese cooking styles. Vinegar (made from the toddy of local coconut trees) is used to give the zingy taste to the meat dishes.

Main dishes
Popular Goan Catholic dishes include:
 Ambot tik – A spicy and sour curry prepared with fish
 Arroz doce – A Portuguese sweetened rice custard
 Balchão – A curry made with prawns/shrimp
 Bebinca – A multi-layered baked pudding traditionally eaten at Christmas
 Cafreal – A masala marinade mostly used for chicken or fish made from coriander leaves, green chilies, and other spices. 
 Canja de galinha – A type of chicken broth served with rice and chicken.
 Chamuça – A Goan/Portuguese derivative of the samosa
 Chouriço – A spicy pork sausage
 Croquettes – Fried minced beef rolls, a common snack among Goan Catholics and the Portuguese
 Feijoada – A stew brought by the Portuguese. It is made with meat (beef or pork), beans, and cabbage. 
 Goan Soup

 Roast beef and beef tongue – Popular entrees at Goan celebrations
 Ros omelette – An omelette drowned in spicy chicken or chickpea gravy and served with pão (Portuguese-Goan bread)
 Samarein chi kodi – Goan curry made with fresh and dried prawns 
 Sanna – A dry rice cake; a variant of idli
 Solantule kodi – A spicy coconut and kokum curry
 Sorpotel – A very spicy pork dish eaten with sannas or pão (Goan bread – spelled the same way as in Portugal)
 Vindalho – A spicy curry traditionally made with pork. The name is derived from the Portuguese term for a garlic and wine (vinho e alho or vinha d'alhos) marinade. Contrary to popular versions made outside Goa, a traditional vindalho does not contain any meat besides pork. It also does not contain any potatoes nor is its name related to aloo (potato)
 Xacuti – Type of curry made with roasted grated coconut and pieces of chicken or lamb

Sweets and desserts
Sweets and desserts are known by their Konkani name, Godshem. Popular dishes include:
Cashew laddus
nevryo-Sweet fried dumpling with filling made from grated coconut, sugar, poppy seeds, green cardamom, almonds 
khaje

sakharbhat -Rice with sugar and coconut

payasa
halwa dali kapa (halwa made from red gram), cashew halwa, mango halwa, banana halwa, pumpkin halwa
Dodol
Bebinca
Patoleo or patoli – A dish of turmeric leaves stuffed with rice, dal, jaggery, and coconut
Serradura
Kuswar 
Perada

See also

 Cucumber cake
 Feni
 Canja de Goa
 Urrak

References

External links

 
Indian cuisine by state or union territory
Culture of Goa
Hindu cuisine